Pseudostriga is a monotypic genus of flowering plants belonging to the family Orobanchaceae. The only species is Pseudostriga cambodiana.

Its native range is Indo-China.

References

Orobanchaceae
Orobanchaceae genera
Monotypic Lamiales genera